Frank A. Cady (December 31, 1858 – March 30, 1904) was an American lawyer, real estate dealer and politician from Marshfield, Wisconsin who served as a Republican member of the Wisconsin State Assembly, representing Wood County from 1901 to 1904.

Born in Newport, Wisconsin, Cady was educated in the public schools in Kilbourn City, Wisconsin (now called Wisconsin Dells). In 1883, Cady received his law degree from University of Wisconsin Law School and then practiced law in Marshfield, Wisconsin and then Wisconsin Rapids, Wisconsin. He committed suicide by jumping from a third-floor veranda in Hot Springs, Arkansas, where he had gone because of his health.

References 

1858 births
1904 deaths
1904 suicides
19th-century American politicians
20th-century American politicians
American politicians who committed suicide
Republican Party members of the Wisconsin State Assembly
People from Columbia County, Wisconsin
People from Marshfield, Wisconsin
Suicides by jumping in the United States
Suicides in Arkansas
University of Wisconsin Law School alumni
Wisconsin lawyers